WMMG-FM (93.5 FM) is a variety–formatted radio station licensed to Brandenburg, Kentucky, United States. The station is currently owned by local Chris McGehee under the licensee Meade County Communications, Inc. The station's studios and transmitter facilties are located on KY 313 (Bypass Road) on the southwest side of Brandenburg.

Programming
The current on-air staff includes "Super" Dave Clark, Randy Johnson, Richard Brown, Alex Allen and "Fearless Em". WMMG-FM also airs local high school sports from Meade County High School.

History
WMMG signed on-the-air in August of 1972. Just two years later, the station was destroyed by an F5 tornado during the 1974 Super Outbreak. Following the disaster, WMMG operated from temporary studios at Meade County High School with a short 15–foot (4.5 meter) antenna until rebuilding. 

The station was joined by a new daytime-only AM companion station, WMMG at 1140 kHz, in 1984. At this time the FM station's call letters added an "-FM" suffix. WMMG-FM was sold to Chris McGehee ten years later. The AM companion station, WMMG, was deleted in 2019.

References

External links

MMG-FM
Brandenburg, Kentucky
Variety radio stations in the United States